Matti Mäkinen (born 18 January 1947 in Paimio) is a Finnish orienteering competitor. He received a bronze medal in the relay event at the 1976 World Orienteering Championships in Aviemore, together with Hannu Mäkirinta, Markku Salminen and Kimmo Rauhamäki.

See also
 List of orienteers
 List of orienteering events

References

1947 births
Living people
Finnish orienteers
Male orienteers
Foot orienteers
World Orienteering Championships medalists